Juba Valley Veterinary Institute or Af Somali Kuliyada Xanaanada Xoolaha ee Dooxada Juba, Arabic: (بالفعل وادي البيطري المعهد), Italian: Giuba Valle Veterinario Instituto is a veterinary institute in Bardera, Gedo Somalia. The Institute is part of Bardera Polytechnic specialized schools and institutes within the college system.

History 

The Institute was created to help thousands of agro-pastoral families whose animals roam in six adjacent regions in south and southwestern Somalia, Gedo, Middle Juba, Lower Juba, Bay, Bakol and Lower Shabelle. These regions contain far more animals than the country's central, northern or eastern regions. Lower Shabele University and Bardera Polytechnic have partnered to train people to work in the agriculture and livestock industries.

Agro-pastoralism 

The economy in the three Juba Valley regions, with the exception of fishing communities along the Kismayo coast, make their living with agro-pastoral practices. The Institute will be the first in southern Somalia to advocate the development and growth of the livestock sector.

Following the start of the Somali Civil War in 1991, villagers and people in mid-sized towns started owning sheep, cattle or camel for milk and cash value. Most other jobs disappeared for two decades.

During the 1970s and 1980s, farmers raised cattle for milk, meat and to sell at the Kismayo Livestock Market and for the meat processing plant in Kismayo. The Ministry of Livestock and National Range was the sole authority in Somalia for the welfare of domestic or wild animals.

Economic improvements 

Social economists in Gedo Region led by Rowda Mohamed Barre and Bardera Polytechnic Dean Abdirahman Abdi Sheekh as well as elders in Luq, Bardera, Buale and Jilib and elsewhere in Juba Valley claimed that trained technicians helping farmers would improve the regional economy. As of 2013, only Kenya and Ethiopia buy Somalia livestock.

New markets 

More wealthy markets in the Mideast receive no livestock beyond what is exported from Berbera and Bosasa ports. Only forty thousand heads of sheep and camel reach Saudi markets for two festival occasions there. None of these animals are from top livestock regions in southern Somali. The three Juba Valley Regions contain some 30% of Somalia's livestock headcount.

Wild animals 

Until the 1970s, the mountain areas of Gedo hosted safari animals from elephants to cheetahs. Poachers killed most of them, but it is not uncommon to hear lions roar during the night hours. Lions, ostriches, oryx, giraffes, warthogs and hyenas are plentiful around the grassy lands of the western part of the Bardera District, between the towns of Gerileey and Fafahdun. Between Buale and Jilib, there are aggressive lions who kill animals, mostly camel coming in the area for grazing during dry season in mid-region grazing areas from El Wak to Sakow.

Zoos 

Zoos have been proposed for Garbaharey, Bardera and Kismayoe.

External links 

 Bardera Polytechnic www.baardheerepolytechnic.org

Gedo
Educational institutions established in 2011
Bardera Polytechnic
Veterinary organizations
2011 establishments in Somalia